Sybil Lynch, known simply as Sybil, is an American R&B and pop singer–songwriter. Sybil gained notable success in her career with songs during the mid-1980s into the mid-1990s. She is the cousin of former En Vogue singer Maxine Jones.

Career
Sybil signed to Next Plateau Records in the United States (with a licensing deal with Champion Records in the United Kingdom) and began recording in 1986 with the release of her first single "Falling in Love". The record reached the top 30 on the Dance charts and began a successful career for Sybil, releasing her debut album Let Yourself Go a year later, which was a minor hit. Sybil achieved worldwide crossover hits with her cover versions of Dionne Warwick's hits "Don't Make Me Over" and "Walk On By", which were released in 1989 and 1990, respectively. The former became Sybil's biggest hit in the US, peaking at No. 20, and was a No. 1 hit in New Zealand. "Walk On By" is still, to date, the highest charting position for this Burt Bacharach/Hal David classic in the UK, peaking at No. 6, closely followed by Gabrielle (No. 7). Sybil's self-titled second album became her biggest-selling album in the US. She signed with PWL Records for the UK market for this album, where it was titled Walk On By. Sybil would be signed to PWL Records until 1998.

Sybil's third album, Sybilization was released in the fall of 1990, but went largely unnoticed. In January 1993, Sybil achieved her most successful hit in the UK charts, with a cover of "The Love I Lost" peaking at No. 3; its follow-up "When I'm Good and Ready" peaked at No. 5. That same year, Sybil released two different albums: Doin' It Now! in North America and Good 'N' Ready in Europe. While sharing four songs on their track listing, Doin' It Now! has a more R&B/soul sound, while Good N' Ready mixes her soul sound with Stock and Waterman-penned Europop. In the US, "The Love I Lost" was released as a double A-side with the Sybil co-penned original "You're The Love of My Life" as the first single of the album.

In 1997, Sybil terminated her contract with Next Plateau Records with a Greatest Hits album, and later that same year, she released her last album to date, Still a Thrill, which was released in Europe and Japan only. Afterward, Sybil kept a low profile, still touring and releasing new house/dance singles in the new millennium aimed at the club market. Sybil appeared on the UK version of the TV series Hit Me, Baby, One More Time in 2005 performing her hit "When I'm Good and Ready". Afterwards, she began working in education, formerly teaching lyric and songwriting composition and creative writing, and later becoming a program director and lead achievement coach at Guilford Technical Community College in Greensboro, North Carolina.

Discography

Studio albums

 Album was released as Sybil in North America and Australasia and as Walk On By in the United Kingdom.

Compilation albums
Greatest Hits (1997, Next Plateau)
Sybil's Greatest Hits (2007)

Remix album
Brighter Days: The Best Remix of Sybil (Japan only) (remix EP) (1998, eastwest)

Singles

Featured singles

Covers
Her song "Make It Easy On Me" was covered by Lisa Scott-Lee on the Steps album Steptacular. The hook of the song "Don't Make Me Over" is sampled on the Caron Wheeler track "I Adore You". "Let Yourself Go" was sampled by Shinji Hosoe on the track "Feeling Over" for Namco's 1994 racing game Ridge Racer.

References

External links
Phobos.apple.com
Traxsource.com
Sybil on discogs https://www.discogs.com/artist/21940-Sybil

1966 births
Living people
American freestyle musicians
American dance musicians
American house musicians
Singers from New Jersey
American contemporary R&B singers
American soul singers
20th-century American singers
20th-century American women singers
21st-century American singers
21st-century American women singers
American women pop singers